Jesse Cramer Stovall (July 24, 1875 – July 12, 1955) was a Major League Baseball pitcher who played for two seasons. He played for the Cleveland Naps in 1903 and the Detroit Tigers in 1904, pitching in 28 career games. His younger brothers, George Stovall (1877–1951) and Samuel Woodson Stovall (1881–1924), were also baseball players.

Personal

Jesse Stovall and his 1st wife Dorothy Evangeline Klapp (1884–1981) were married in Seattle, WA on February 25, 1904. The couple had 1 child, Margaret Etta Stovall (1907–1999) and were divorced in Reno, NV in 1914.

It is unknown when Jesse married second wife Bonnie Ethel Erickson (1888–1955).

References

External links

1875 births
1955 deaths
Major League Baseball pitchers
Cleveland Naps players
Detroit Tigers players
Baseball players from Missouri
Minor league baseball managers
Seattle Clamdiggers players
San Francisco Pirates players
Seattle Siwashes players
Minneapolis Millers (baseball) players
Louisville Colonels (minor league) players
St. Paul Saints (AA) players
Vernon Tigers players
Portland Pippins players
Butte Miners players